The Auster Islands are a group of small islands at the northeast end of the Robinson Group, located  north of Cape Daly, Mac. Robertson Land. They were mapped from Australian National Antarctic Research Expeditions (ANARE) surveys and from air photos 1959–66, and so named by the Antarctic Names Committee of Australia  because of the nearness of the islands to Auster rookery, and because they have provided a camp site for ANARE parties visiting the rookery.

See also 
 List of Antarctic and sub-Antarctic islands

References
 

Islands of Mac. Robertson Land